Le Jeu des 1000 euros (translation: The 1000 Euros Game) is a French daily radio game show broadcast on France Inter. Created in 1958 by Henri Kubnick under the name 100000 francs par jour (translation: 100,000 French Francs By Day), it is the longest-running program on French radio.

Because of the change of the French currency value over the years, it was renamed multiple times before taking its present name. It has been hosted respectively by Henri Kubnick, Albert Raisner, Maurice Gardett, Roger Lanzac, Pierre Le Rouzic, Lucien Jeunesse for 30 years from 1965 to 1995, Louis Bozon from September 1995 to June 2008, and is currently being hosted by Nicolas Stoufflet.

Overview 
The show travels throughout the year to many French towns, usually once a week. The show has also travelled to the United States, Portugal, Guadeloupe, Martinique, Réunion, the Clemenceau Airport, on the ocean liner Massalia, and in a submarine. The show is recorded, then broadcast a few days later in several stages.

Blue, white, and red questions 
Contestants draw six questions in three colors, (blue, white, and red) to answer: three blue questions, two white questions, and one red question. The questions are developed by the audience, but the production team ranks them by difficulty. For each question, the contestants are allowed to provide multiple answers for up to 30 seconds. Questions that are not answered correctly are then rephrased, but only one answer is permitted within 15 seconds.

At this stage, there are three possibilities:
 If the contestants respond correctly to four questions or less, the game ends and they keep their winnings;
 If the contestants respond correctly to five questions, they can try to answer a "draft" question that is made easier because three possible choices are provided (it is the only question that is not posed by the audience). If they fail to answer correctly, the contestants keep their winnings. If they answer correctly, they are forced to try the Banco. When the show was moderated by Roger Lanzac and the Pinder circus, the "draft" question would be replaced with a sports feat, led by a strongman. After that, racing a bicycle for a given distance was used. Since 2008 with the arrival of Nicolas Stoufflet, the "draft" question has been replaced sometimes with a sound clip;
 If the contestants respond correctly to all six questions, they can leave with their winnings (150 euros) or they can try the Banco. At this moment, the recorded audience traditionally yells "ban-co, ban-co!" to encourage the contestant, after which the contestant usually makes their attempt.

For each question, response time is sounded by an assistant playing a glockenspiel, a small metallophone, with four hammers. This instrument, with its unique sound, has become an emblem of the show. Yann Pailleret, for 18 years, has assumed this role. His predecessor, François Lependu, retired after 25 years in this role.

Banco and Super-Banco 

The Banco is a question judged difficult and is classed into a specific category.

The contestants are only allowed one response to the question but they are allowed a minute to respond. They can consult their team.

If the response is correct, the prize has been 500 euros since September 2009. Before the euro replaced the franc in 2001, the Banco prize was 1,000 francs, which was the derivation of the name of the original show. The banco prize was 400 euros between 2001 and June 2009.

If the response is incorrect, the contestants lose all their winnings and leave with a portable radio.

Contestants that correctly respond to the Banco question can also try the Super Banco question. The recorded audience encourages the contestants by chanting "su-per, su-per!" The play of Super Banco is the same as with Banco, but the question is raffled from among the toughest questions from the audience.

If the response is correct, the contestants receive 1,000 euros. Before the passage of the euro, the Super Banco prize was 3,000 francs, and then 5,000 francs. In the case of failure, the contestants lose all their winnings and leave with a portable radio.

Prizes 
For the blue, white, and red questions, the prizes are the same for the contestant team, or in the case of an incorrect response, the audience member that provides the question. The prizes are 15 euros per blue question, 30 euros per white question, and 45 euros per red question. For the "draft" question, the Banco question, and the Super Banco question, the audience member that developed the question earns only 45 euros if the contestants respond incorrectly.

History

20th Century 

Le Jeu des 1 000 francs, the name of the original show, is the oldest quiz show in the French radio broadcasting world that is still aired. The first show was recorded on April 19, 1958, in a drawn marquee in the marketplace of Blanc and was broadcast two days later on France Inter.

100 000 francs par jour
Installed each day in a different town under the Pinder circus tent, the game consisted of, from its start, a series of cultural questions posed to a team of two contestants, who could win a final prize of 100,000 francs. Originally named 100 000 francs par jour, the name changed to 1 000 francs par jour, after the passage of the new franc. After that, the name became Le Jeu des mille franc.

The contestant team is composed of a captain and a reinforcement. In the original game, the questions were posed to the captain. If the answers were not responded to, the questions were then posed to the reinforcement. Today, this differentiation does not exist and the moderator simultaneously addresses both contestants of a team.

From Henri Kubnick to Lucien Jeunesse
At the start, it was Henri Kubnick that prepared the questions. But, because the audience started sending questions, it was decided that the questions would be prepared by them. The questions are divided by difficulty indicated by color: in order of increasing difficulty, blue, white, and red.

After Henri Kubnick, the show went through a series of moderators: Maurice Gardett, Albert Raisner, Roger Lanzac, Pierre Le Rouzic (1965), and Lucien Jeunesse (1965 - 1995), who retired with the longest run as moderator of the show. Moderators would always leave the show with the following saying: "À demain, si vous le voulez bien!" - "See you tomorrow, if you want it!" and "À lundi, si le cœur vous en dit!" - "See you Monday, if your heart is in it!"

In June 1995, after spending 30 years traveling the roads, Lucien Jeunesse, at the age of 77, decided to retire. In an interview on the last day with France 2, the moderator recalled spending time in 10,000 hotel rooms, eating 20,000 restaurant meals, and making 40,000 phone calls to his wife. The last recording was identical to the previous ones, without the moderator saying "adieu".

False start and "spécial jeunes"
On June 7, 1995, France Inter removed the show from its programing after the departure of Lucien Jeunesse, with whom the public identified the show. This decision provoked an abundance of protest. The show returned in September 1995 with Louis Bozon.

On December 6, 1995, the creation of the "Spécial Jeunes" - young people program - broadened the audience of the show to college students and high school students.

21st Century 

At the time of the replacement of the franc with the euro on January 1, 2002, the show was renamed Le Jeu des mille euros, the purpose of which was to keep the same operation and principles for the identity of the game, with a little planning related to the conversion. The banco became a 400 euro prize (then in 2009, it became a 500 euro prize). The super banco became a 1,000 euro prize.

In April 2008, the show celebrated its 50th anniversary, and still remained the most popular French radio program at 12:45 PM UCT+1: 1.395 million listeners and 15.6% of the market share.

The game outside of France 
Some months later, on June 27, 2008, Louis Bozon moderates his last show after 13 years. On September 1, 2008, Nicolas Stoufflet becomes the 8th moderator of the show.

With France Inter in New York on September 9, 2011, for the commemoration of September 11, 2001, the game takes place on September 8 and September 9 with a new name, Le Jeu des 1 000 dollars.

In 2016, the team was in Portugal. The first show was recorded in Porto on March 8, 2016, with a second in Lisbon on March 9, 2016.

A sexagenarian game 
For the anniversary of its sixtieth year, the production organized three programs (including one for young people) that were recorded on April 11, 2018, in a celebration in Blanc, where the show originally aired 60 years ago. Another show in the set of these programs was recorded in June 2018 with moderators from France Inter, including Charline Vanhoenecker and Léa Salamé, who formed duos with other contestants, and with an exceptional winnings potential (for a superbanco) of 2,000 euro.

Team

Moderator 
The show has been moderated successively by the following moderators:
 Henri Kubnick, from 1958
 Maurice Gardett, briefly in 1960  
 Albert Raisner, in 1961 
 Roger Lanzac, from 1961 to 1965
 Pierre Le Rouzic, in 1965
 Lucien Jeunesse, from 1965 to June 1995 
 Louis Bozon, from September 1995 to June 2008 
 Nicolas Stoufflet, from September 1, 2008, to present

Production 
 Producer: Nicolas Stoufflet
 Director: Yann Pailleret
 Production assistants: Marie-Claude Malartique and Kheira Retiel

The show popular culture 

The ritual of the show is conducive to its caricature. A person can mention the Jeu des Mille Fesses - Game of a thousand Butts - of Lucien Lasemence from Pierre Desproges's satirical radio show on France Inter Le Tribunal des flagrants délires and recognize that it comes from the title of Le Jeu des 1 000 euros.

In addition, the game is found elsewhere outside of radio:
 Board Games:
 The jeu des 1000 francs, published in 1960 by Ceji interlude jeu
 The jeu des 1000 francs, published in 1978 by Dujardin
 The box of Jeu des 1000 euros, published in 2013 by Marabout
 The box of Jeu des 1000 euros, published in 2017 by Marabout
 Video Games: the show was adapted for the iPhone et iPad by Bulkypix
 Books:
 
 
 
 
 
 
 Television:
 Report for ORTF in 1967
 Le Jeu des 1 000 succès for France 5, a documentary dedicated in 2007 to several weeks in the life of the team from Jeu des 1 000 euros
 Program Journal de 13 heures from France 2 dedicated to the Jeu des mille euros on April 28, 2008, and May 2, 2008, which focuses in particular on the brothers Jean and José Pasquale, prolific producers of questions, as well as Gabriel Gianello, record holder for the number of (Louis Bozon era) winning games with seven.
 Reporting in 2010 on Vendée TV
 Web Documentaries: Le Jeu des 1 000 histoires, a documentary that was released in May 2013 written by Philippe Brault for Upian/France Inter/Radio France Nouveaux Medias: A small historical production to meet those who make the oldest radio game in France and those who listen to it.
 Film: Tandem from Patrice Leconte in 1987 recalls the life of the moderators of a radio game show that resembles  Jeu des mille francs
 Theater: Le Jeu des 1 000 euros from Bertrand Bossard (2012), a theatrical production performed at Centquatre-Paris.

References

External links 
 

1958 radio programme debuts
French public radio programs
French talk radio programs
Quiz games
Trivia competitions
Quiz shows